Asaphodes citroena is a species of moth in the family Geometridae. This species is endemic to New Zealand and has been collected in Westland. It inhabits native forest and scrub and has also been collected in open spaces along riverbeds. Adults are on the wing in December and January.

Taxonomy
This species was described by Charles E. Clarke in 1934 as Xanthorhoe citroena using material collected by himself in December 1928 at Waiho Gorge near the Franz Josef glacier in Westland. George Hudson discussed and illustrated this species under the name Xanthorhoe citroena in his 1939 book A supplement to the butterflies and moths of New Zealand. In 1987 Robin C. Craw proposed assigning this species to the genus Asaphodes. In 1988 John S. Dugdale agreed with this proposal. The holotype specimen is held at the Auckland War Memorial Museum.

Description

Clarke described the species as follows:

Distribution
This species is endemic to New Zealand. This species has been collected in Westland.

Biology and life cycle
The adults of this species is on the wing in December and January.

Habitat
This species inhabits the edges of native forest and scrub and has been collected in open spaces along riverbeds.

References

Larentiinae
Moths described in 1934
Moths of New Zealand
Endemic fauna of New Zealand
Endemic moths of New Zealand